Miss Universo Chile 2012, the 49th Miss Universo Chile pageant, held at the Enjoy Santiago, Casino & Resort on October 26, 2012. The winner, Ana Luisa König from O'Higgins, represented her country in Miss Universe 2012 in Las Vegas, Nevada, United States on December 19, 2012.

Final results

Special awards

 Miss Congeniality - Emilia Depassier (Bío Bío)

Delegates

Jury

 Vanessa Ceruti, Miss Universo Chile 2011
 Raquel Argandoña, TV Presenter & Miss Universo Chile 1975
 Juan Falcón, Actor
 Carolina Parsons, Model
 Carolina Ruiz, Model
 Gabriel Schkolnick, Photographer
 Luis Francisco Dotto, Founder of Dotto Agency
 Majed Kahlil, President of Sun Channel TV

Notes
 The pageant is being organized by Luciano Marrochino, Enjoy Casino & Resort and Camilo Valdivia.
 Sara Bravo and Daniela Llanos withdrew of the competition.

References

External links
 Official Miss Universo Chile

Miss Universo Chile
2012 in Chile
2012 beauty pageants